Nathan Hale (1755–1776) was an American spy during the Revolutionary War.

Nathan Hale may also refer to:

People 
 Nathan Hale (colonel) (1743–1780), American Revolutionary War officer who died as a prisoner of the British
 Nathan Hale (journalist) (1784–1863), American journalist and newspaper publisher who introduced regular editorial comment
 Nathan W. Hale (1860–1941), U.S. Representative from Tennessee
 Nate Dogg (1969–2011), American hip hop singer born Nathaniel Dwayne Hale
 Nathan Hale (character), protagonist of the PS3 game Resistance: Fall of Man and its sequel Resistance 2

Schools 
 Nathan Hale Middle School in Norwalk, Connecticut
 Nathan Hale High School (disambiguation)

Others 
 Fort Nathan Hale, New Haven, Connecticut
 Nathan Hale (statue), an 1893 bronze statue sculpted by Frederick William MacMonnies
 Captain Nathan Hale (statue), a 1915 bronze statue by Bela Lyon Pratt
 USS Nathan Hale (SSBN-623), an American submarine
 Nathan Hale (fireboat), an emergency vessel operated by the city of New Haven, Connecticut

See also
 Nathan Hale Williams (born 1976), American film and television producer
 Nathan K. Hall (1810–1874), U.S. Representative from New York and Postmaster General

Hale, Nathan